The Weller ULI NG (New Generation), sometimes called the Weller Uli NG, is a German ultralight aircraft, designed and produced by Weller Flugzeugbau of Bibersfeld. It was introduced at the Aero show held in Friedrichshafen in 2010. The aircraft is supplied as a complete ready-to-fly-aircraft.

Design and development
The aircraft is derived from the Egon Scheibe Uli 1 and was re-designed to comply with the German  class ultralight rules. It features a cable-braced high-wing, a single-seat open cockpit without a windshield, fixed conventional landing gear and a single engine in pusher configuration.

The aircraft fuselage is made from welded steel tubing, the wing built from bolted-together aluminum tubing, with its flying surfaces covered in aircraft fabric. The standard engine available is the  Briggs & Stratton industrial four-stroke powerplant with a V-belt reduction drive, powering a two bladed wooden propeller. The aircraft's  fuel tank is detachable for refueling and is filled with premium auto-fuel. The design incorporates a ballistic parachute whole-aircraft rescue system that includes an ignition cut-off upon firing.

Specifications (version)

References

External links

2010s German ultralight aircraft
Single-engined pusher aircraft